Parzanica is a comune (municipality) in the Province of Bergamo in the Italian region of Lombardy, located about  northeast of Milan and about  east of Bergamo.

Parzanica borders the following municipalities: Fonteno, Marone, Monte Isola, Riva di Solto, Tavernola Bergamasca, Vigolo.

Demographic evolution

References